An Awgatha (ဩကာသ; from Pali: okāsa), sometimes known as the common Buddhist prayer is a formulaic Burmese Buddhist prayer that is recited to initiate acts of Buddhist devotion, including obeisance to the Buddha and Buddhist monks and the water libation ritual. The term okāsa literally means "permission" in Pali, and is used to request permission to pay homage, seek forgiveness of any intentional and unintentional offenses, and precedes the undertaking of the Five Precepts. Minor variations of this Burmese language prayer exist from one Buddhist monastery to another. Okāsa explicitly references the gadaw of the Five Infinite Venerables (Buddha, Dhamma, Sangha, parents and teachers).

Standard prayer

See also 
 Three Refuges
 Five Precepts
 Gadaw
 Paritta
 Prostration (Buddhism)
 Buddhism in Myanmar

References 

Buddhism in Myanmar
Buddhist rituals